Elatos (before 1927: Δραγαλεβός – Dragalevos) is a village in the municipality of North Kynouria, Arcadia, Greece. It is situated on a forested mountainside in the northern Parnon mountains, at 840 m elevation. As of 2011, it had a population of 56. It is 0.5 km south of Oria, 3 km north of Agios Petros, 16 km southwest of Astros and 24 km southeast of Tripoli.

Population

See also
 List of settlements in Arcadia

External links
 Local directory of the council of Elatos

References

Populated places in Arcadia, Peloponnese